WFM may refer to:

Science and technology
 Waveform monitor a type of oscilloscope used to monitor video signals
 Wired for Management, an Intel standard for managing computer systems
 Wideband FM, a form of frequency modulated radio

Organisations
 Western Federation of Miners, an American labor union
 Whole Foods Market, an American foods supermarket
 World Federalist Movement, a global citizens movement

Other
 Wallace Fard Muhammad, founder of the Nation of Islam
 Woman FIDE Master, a title awarded by FIDE to women chess players after fulfilling certain requirements
 Workforce management, the activities related to a company's employees
 WFM (motorcycle), defunct Polish motorcycle manufacturer